The Liga Española de Baloncesto, also known as LEB Oro, is the second basketball division of the Spanish basketball league system after the Liga ACB. It is run by the FEB. The Liga Española de Baloncesto is divided into two categories (the other one is the LEB Plata). The LEB league was founded in 1996 and is played under FIBA rules. It was renamed LEB Oro in 2007. 

The league is contested by 18 clubs. Each season, the top-finishing team in the LEB Oro are automatically promoted to the Liga ACB. The teams that finish the season in 2nd to 9th place enter a playoff tournament, with the winner also gaining promotion to the Liga ACB. The three lowest-finishing teams in the LEB Oro are relegated to LEB Plata.

A total of 78 teams have competed in LEB Oro since its inception in 1996. 19 teams have been crowned champions and 30 teams have gained promotion to Liga ACB, of which only five teams could not play in Liga ACB. Club Melilla Baloncesto is the only team that played all seasons of the league.

Championship format

Each team of has to play with all the other teams of its division twice, once at home and the other at the opponent's arena.

Each victory adds two points to the team in the league ranking, while each loss adds only one. At the end of the league:

 The winner of the Regular season promotes directly to Liga ACB.
 Teams qualified between second and ninth position play the promotion play-offs, where the winner promotes with the regular season champion to Liga ACB.
 The worst or the two worst teams are relegated to LEB Plata.

At the half of the league, the two first teams in the table play the Copa Princesa at home of the winner of the first half season. The Champion of this Cup will play the play-offs as first qualified if it finishes the league between the 2nd and the 5th qualified.

LEB History

The two first teams are promoted to ACB. Since 2007–08, is known as LEB Oro (LEB Gold) and the regular season champion promotes to ACB without playing the playoffs. The winner of the Playoffs Finals is the other promoted team.

League names 
 1996–2006: LEB
 2006–2007: Adecco LEB
 2007–2015: Adecco Oro
 2015–present: LEB Oro

Champions

Performance by club

Awards at LEB Oro
 LEB Oro Final Four MVP

Records at LEB Oro

Stats leaders

All-time top performances

Games played

Points

Rebounds

Assists

Steals

Blocks

Records in a game
Most points
50 by Antwain Barbour (Tenerife) vs. Lucentum on November 21, 2008
Most rebounds
26 by Jakim Donaldson (Canarias) vs. Melilla on February 15, 2008
Most offensive rebounds
21 by Willie Walls (Inca) vs. Gijón on February 8, 2003
Most defensive rebounds
16 by Willie Walls (Inca) vs. Tenerife on April 16, 2003
Most assists
17 by Silas Mills (Calpe) vs. Cantabria on December 12, 2004
Most three-pointers
11 by Tony Smith (Murcia) vs. Tenerife on April 3, 1998 (6,25m)
9 by Albert Sàbat (Canarias) vs. Cáceres on March 2, 2011 (6,75m)
Most steals
11 by Gimel Lewis (Cantabria) vs. Gijón on March 30, 2007
11 by Jeff Xavier (Palencia) vs. Huesca on September 30, 2011
Most blocks
13 by Lester Earl (Melilla) vs. Coruña on January 18, 2002
Most PIR
65 by Derrell Washington (Pineda de Mar) vs. Askatuak on September 28, 1996

Current clubs

Copa Princesa de Asturias

All-time LEB Oro table
The All-time LEB Oro table is an overall record of all match results of every team that has played in LEB Oro since the 1996–97 season. The table is accurate as of the end of the 2019–20 season.

League or status at 2019–20 season:

The second division before LEB Oro
Before 1996, teams promoted to Liga ACB from other second division leagues. The number of teams promoted varies each year.

LEB Plata

The LEB Plata is the Spanish basketball third league since 2001, the second division of the leagues organized by the Spanish Basketball Federation. The best teams promotes to LEB Oro and the last qualified ones are relegated to Liga EBA.

LEB Bronce
In 2007, the Spanish Basketball Federation decided to create a third LEB with 18 teams, like the other two. Since that day, renamed LEB as LEB Oro (LEB Gold) and LEB-2 as LEB Plata (LEB Silver). This new league was called LEB Bronce, three first teams were promoted each year to LEB Plata and the four last teams were relegated to Liga EBA.

LEB Bronce had also its Cup, like the other LEBs. In 2009, after two seasons, LEB Bronce was removed due to the difficulties of the teams that enjoyed the new league.

Copa LEB Bronce

Notes

References

External links 
  Official website
  Spanish Basketball Federation Official Website

2
1
SpainGre
1996 establishments in Spain
Professional sports leagues in Spain